Laura Méndez Esquer (born 6 November 1988 in Valencia) is a Spanish long distance runner.

Mendez was the Spanish junior champion in the 3000m indoors in 2007 and runner-up in the senior Spanish Championship at the 3000m indoors in 2015. She was selected to represent Spain in the World Athletics Half Marathon Championships in Gdynia, Poland  in 2020. In April 2021 she ran her debut marathon in Enschede, Netherlands and achieved the qualifying standard for the delayed 2020 Olympic Games in Tokyo in her first ever competitive marathon. Mèndez competed in Tokyo but did not finish the Olympic marathon course. In May 2022, Mèndez won the Spanish national championship 10k race setting a new national record time of 33.15.

Achievements

References

External links
 
 
 
 

1988 births
Living people
Spanish female marathon runners
Olympic athletes of Spain
Athletes (track and field) at the 2020 Summer Olympics
Sportspeople from Valencia
21st-century Spanish women
20th-century Spanish women